Jebel Proywe is a mountain in the Abarim range in Jordan.

References

Mountains of Jordan